Agra vation is a species of carabid beetle, named as a pun on the word aggravation.

References

Lebiinae
Beetles described in 1983